Lake Maracaibo (Spanish: Lago de Maracaibo; Anu: Coquivacoa) is a lagoon in northwestern Venezuela, the largest lake in South America and one of the oldest on Earth, formed 36 million years ago in the Andes Mountains. The fault in the northern section has collapsed and is rich in oil and gas resources. It is Venezuela's main oil producing area and an important fishing and agricultural producing area. It is inhabited by a quarter of the country's population and is also the place with the most frequent lightning on earth. The famous Catatumbo lightning can illuminate nighttime navigation, and eutrophication caused by oil pollution is a major environmental problem facing the lake.

Geography
Lake Maracaibo is located in the Maracaibo lowland in the faulted basin between the Perija Mountains and the Merida Mountains of the Eastern Cordillera Mountains in northwestern Venezuela. The lake is in the shape of a vase. It is 210 kilometers long from north to south, 121 kilometers wide from east to west, covers an area of 13,512 square kilometers, the deepest is 35 meters, the shore length is about 1000 kilometers, and the volume is about 280 cubic kilometers. The largest river entering the lake, the Catatumbo River, enters the lake from west to east, providing 57% of the water entering the lake. In addition to the influence of the prevailing wind, the lake water circulates counterclockwise. There are also the Santa Ana River, Chama River, Motatán River, Escalante River, and about fifty other rivers which drain into it.

Lake Maracaibo is deep in the south and shallow in the north. The northern half of the lake, which looks like a bottleneck, is 55 kilometers long. The southeastern edge of the lake basin with a flat bottom is steep and the northwestern edge is gentle. It is slightly salty due to the influence of tides, and the overall salinity is between 1.5 and 3.8%. The Catatumbo River forms a bird-foot-shaped delta in the southwest of the lake basin, and the surface lake water in the delta has a salinity of only 0.13%. However, the intrusion of seawater from the mouth of the lake makes the salinity of the bottom lake water higher, reaching 0.2-0.3%. The north is connected with the Gulf of Venezuela, and the spit at the mouth of the lake extends for about 26 kilometers.

The annual average temperature of the lake area is 28°C, the precipitation is more in the south and less in the north, and the average annual rainfall in the south is 1400 mm. The mountain wind from the Andes at night contacts the warm and humid air on the lake surface, forming an average of 297 mm per year. The second night thunderstorm makes the lake area the place with the most frequent lightning on earth. There are about 233 lightning strikes per square kilometer in a year on average. The nocturnal thunderstorms occur on average about 297 days per year. At its peak in September, the lake area can experience up to 280 lightning strikes per hour, approximately 28 lightning strikes per minute, lasting up to 9 hours, and is capable of illuminating nighttime navigation.

History
Lake Maracaibo is one of the oldest lakes on earth. It was formed 36 million years ago when the faults collapsed when the Andes were uplifted in the late Eocene. In the geological history, sea water and fresh water have alternated many times, and have flooded the area. At the end of the last glacial period, the sea level rose, connecting Lake Maracaibo directly with the Atlantic Ocean, and the lighter fresh water floated on the heavier salt water, causing nutrients to be deposited on the bottom of the lake, forming the formation on the bedrock. More than five kilometers thick sediment.

The Spanish explorer Alonso de Ojeda's fleet sailed here on August 24, 1499, the first time Europeans entered this area. Spain made two attempts to establish settlements around the lake in 1529 and 1569, but it was not until 1574 that the city of Maracaibo was successfully established. On June 24, 1823, Venezuela won the famous Battle of Lake Maracaibo on the lake during the Venezuelan War of Independence.

The original depth of the lake mouth, which was only more than 4 meters deep, was increased to 8 meters after dredging in the 1930s, and the 3-kilometer-long stone breakwater was further increased to 11 meters after its completion in 1957, allowing ocean-going tankers to enter the lake, At the same time, the northern part, which was originally fresh water, became brackish. The 8,678-meter General Rafael Udaneta Bridge over the lake connecting Maracaibo and Santa Rita was completed in 1962.

Industry

Lake Maracaibo is rich in oil and gas resources and is known as the "oil lake". The first Spaniards who arrived used tar seeping from the lake to fill ship cracks. The Maracaibo oil field was discovered in 1914, the first oil well was constructed in 1917, and large-scale exploitation began in 1922. The oil fields are concentrated in the northeast and northwest of the lake, and the oil-producing layers are mainly Tertiary sandstone and Cretaceous limestone, with a hydrocarbon-bearing area of 1,300 square kilometers, mainly concentrated in the coastal waters 105 kilometers long and 32 kilometers wide in the east of the lake, the extracted oil accounts for 75% of Venezuela's total oil production.

Maracaibo on the northwest coast is the capital of Zulia State, the second largest city in Venezuela and an important oil export port in the world. The lake area is also an important fishing and agricultural production area in Venezuela, supporting more than 20,000 fishermen, many of whom live in colorful traditional stilt houses built with iron sheets on the lake. The main crops on the south bank of the lake are bananas, Peanuts, cocoa, coconut, sugar cane and coffee, the western shore of the lake developed dairy industry.

Lake Maracaibo and the Catatumbo River are the main traffic lines for the transportation of commodities in the nearby area, and the city of Maracaibo is the transshipment center of coffee produced in the Andes. The waterway can pass through large sea-going ships and oil tankers, exporting crude oil and agricultural and livestock products from the Andean mountains and lakes. The Lake District is home to a quarter of Venezuela's population, and with the influx of farmers from the nearby Andes, the population of the Lake District increased from about 300,000 in 1936 to over 3.62 million in 2007.

Nature
Lake Maracaibo is home to clams, blue crabs, shrimps and other aquatic products, and is also home to two endangered aquatic mammals, the West Indian manatee and the Amazon river dolphin. About 145 species of fish inhabit the lake, including many endemic species such as the Maracaibo half-hooked catfish, the Maracaibo hairy catfish, the Maracaibo Lake Lamont catfish, Lake Maracaibo tetra, and Maracaibo wolf anchovies living in surface waters.

The lake has been drilled about 14,000 times, and more than 15,000 miles of oil and gas pipelines criss-cross the lake floor, but most of these pipelines are half a century old, with oil leaking from many aging underwater pipes. Before the 1950s, the lake water could still be used directly for domestic use, but then due to the intrusion of tidal salt water caused by the widening of the lake mouth channel, the salinity of the northern lake area increased by about 1,000%, and the south also increased by 300-500%.

In lakeside towns such as the city of Maracaibo, the lake water is contaminated with E. coli from feces, oil pollution, and eutrophication caused by agricultural sewage discharged into the lake, as well as domestic and industrial wastewater, resulting in the blooms of duckweed and green algae. In the spring of 2004, heavy rains fell in the Lake Maracaibo basin, causing a large influx of fresh water into the lake. This caused nutrients originally deposited on the bottom of the lake to float to the surface of the lake, which in turn allowed the duckweed to rapidly multiply and triggered a bloom that lasted for up to eight months. The blooms were noted in June to have covered 18% of the lake, and the local government had to begin spending about $2 million per month on cleanup work.

Photos

References

 
Ancient lakes
Maracaibo basin
Bays of Venezuela
Geography of Zulia